To the Workingmen of America, known as the Pittsburgh Manifesto or Pittsburgh Proclamation, is an anarchist manifesto issued at the October 1883 Pittsburgh Congress of the International Working People's Association. After the organization faded, the manifesto remained generally accepted by American anarchists as a clear articulation of their beliefs.

References

Bibliography

Further reading

External links 

October 1883 events
Anarchism in the United States
Anarchist manifestos
Events in Pittsburgh